Monsters of Men is a young-adult science fiction novel by Patrick Ness, published by Walker Books in May 2010. It is the third book of the Chaos Walking trilogy inaugurated two years earlier by The Knife of Never Letting Go. Walker's U.S. division Candlewick Press published hardcover and audiobook editions within the calendar year.

Ness won the annual Carnegie Medal from the British librarians, recognising the year's best new book for children or young adults published in the U.K.

The title is taken from previous dialogue in the series; "War makes monsters of men" is said in Knife, which both Todd and Viola later quote.

Plot summary

An army of Spackle, the indigenous population of the planet, marches on New Prentisstown from one direction, and the forces of The Answer from the other. Mayor Prentiss has been freed by Todd to help defend the city, whilst Viola attempts to warn incoming settlers.

The Mayor's army and the Spackle army engage in a destructive battle. Meanwhile, Viola and Mistress Coyle confer with Bradley and Simone, the scout ship pilots; Coyle wants to use the ship's missiles to destroy the Mayor. However, the Mayor's army manages to push the Spackle army back into the forest. 1017 has made his way to the Spackle camp, now branded "The Return". He is the only surviving slave, and seeks revenge on Todd and the settlers.

The Spackle dam off the river to block water supply and attack the Mayor's camp. Coyle attempts to manipulate Viola to use the scout ship, and when Todd is in danger, she launches a missile that kills most Spackle warriors. The Return argues with The Sky, the leader of the Spackle, demanding more attacks. The Sky refuses, but reveals a captured, hibernating Ben, Todd's adoptive father. The Sky promises Ben to The Return if the two armies reach peace. The Spackle begin attacking the town at random. During a raid, Todd knocks the failing Mayor unconscious and takes over. The Mayor praises him for having such ability.

The Mayor's army without water, and The Answer without food, are forced into a peace talk. The two groups work together – the Mayor lures Spackle and The Answer provides bombs. Angry that the Mayor undermines her, Coyle sends a bomb into the Spackle stronghold. The Spackle respond with a message to send two people to meet the next morning.

Viola and Bradley are sent to negotiate with the Spackle. The Return attempts to murder Viola in revenge, but stops when he sees the ID band on her arm, sympathising. Although the peace talks are successful, the Spackle launch a surprise attack on the Mayor and Todd the next day. The Mayor, planning ahead, had already set up his artillery and soldiers. After killing the attacking Spackle, The Sky surrenders. The Return goes to kill Ben, angered by both the surrender and his inability to kill Viola. The Sky meets him there, and watches as the Return fails to murder Ben. Ben wakes.

During a speech, Mistress Coyle reveals a suicide bomb, intent on killing the Mayor. Todd inadvertently saves him. Later, Ben and The Return arrive. Todd, overwhelmed by happiness, rejoins Ben and leaves the Mayor's side. The settlers plan to settle peace immediately, leaving Todd and the Mayor alone. Angered by Todd's decision to leave his side, the Mayor steals the scout ship and Todd. The Mayor launches flammable fuel at the forest, killing many Spackle, including The Sky. He passes leadership to The Return.

The Mayor lands at the ocean and ties up Todd in a nearby church, while Viola rides in hopes of rescuing him. The Mayor is being driven mad by all of New World's Noise, a side-effect of his experiments. Todd escapes, and they climactically Noise-fight by the ocean. Viola arrives and the two quickly overpower the Mayor. Todd begins to force the Mayor into the ocean, but the Mayor, realizing his immorality, walks into the ocean himself, and dies.

The Return arrives and mistakes Todd for the Mayor, shooting him in the chest. Todd dies, driving Viola to threaten shooting The Return back. The Return accepts his death, but Ben suddenly swears he can hear Todd's Noise return.

The Spackle attempt to cure Todd with their medicine. His Noise returns in bursts, on and off. Viola will not leave Todd's side until he wakes up. The Return apologises, but Viola does not forgive him, and continues to read Todd's mother's journal to him, hoping he will hear and come back. The epilogue cycles through Todd's experiences in the coma. He is entering his old memories, at his school, at Farbranch, but also human and Spackle memories from all over New World. He searches for Viola, unsure who she is, who he is. Every now and then, he hears extracts from his mother's diary, and he begs Viola to keep calling for him. The novel ends with hope that he'll return, the last lines being "Keep calling for me Viola – 'cuz here I come."

Reception
Critical reception has been largely positive. The Bookseller said the novel was "breathtaking" and noted that it was "innovative, intense writing at its incendiary best".   praised Ness, compared him to Philip Pullman, Robert Cormier, and Paul Zindel, and called the series "too good for the Young Adult strapline."

Beside winning the 2011 Carnegie Medal, Monsters of Men made the Arthur C. Clarke Award shortlist.

See also

References

External links
  —immediately, first US edition 
 

2010 British novels
2010 children's books
2010 science fiction novels
Young adult fantasy novels
British young adult novels
British fantasy novels
British science fiction novels
Children's science fiction novels
Walker Books books
Carnegie Medal in Literature winning works
Novels set on fictional planets
Novels by Patrick Ness